The 2018 Poreč Trophy was the 19th edition of the Poreč Trophy road cycling one day race. It was part of UCI Europe Tour in category 1.2.

Teams
Thirty teams were invited to take part in the race. All of them were UCI Continental or club teams.

Result

References

2018 UCI Europe Tour
2018 in Slovenian sport